The PlayStation 5 (PS5) is a home video game console developed by Sony Interactive Entertainment. It was announced as the successor to the PlayStation 4 in April 2019, was launched on November 12, 2020, in Australia, Japan, New Zealand, North America, and South Korea, and was released worldwide one week later. The PS5 is part of the ninth generation of video game consoles, along with Microsoft's Xbox Series X/S consoles, which were released in the same month.

The base model includes an optical disc drive compatible with Ultra HD Blu-ray discs. The Digital Edition lacks this drive, as a lower-cost model for buying games only through download. The two variants were launched simultaneously.

The PlayStation 5's main hardware features include a solid-state drive customized for high-speed data streaming to enable significant improvements in storage performance, an AMD GPU capable of 4K resolution display at up to 120 frames per second, hardware-accelerated ray tracing for realistic lighting and reflections, and the Tempest Engine for hardware-accelerated 3D audio effects. Other features include the DualSense controller with haptic feedback, backward compatibility with the majority of PlayStation 4 and PlayStation VR games, and the PlayStation VR2 headset.

History

Development

The lead architect of the PlayStation console line, Mark Cerny, implemented a two-year feedback cycle after the launch of the PlayStation 4. This entailed regularly visiting Sony's first-party developers at two-year intervals to find out what concerns they had with shortcomings in Sony's current hardware and how such hardware could be improved in console refreshes or for the next generation. This feedback was fed into the priorities for the console development team. In the development of the PlayStation 5, a key issue was the length of loading times for games. Cerny said several developers, including Epic Games' Tim Sweeney, told him that standard I/O speed of hard disk drives was now a limiting factor in pushing game development. Slow data rates placed limits on the size of data being loaded into the game, the physical location of data on the storage medium, and the duplication of data across the medium in order to reduce load times. An important goal was to find ways to reduce loading time, particularly in games that stream or dynamically load new game areas as the player moves through the game world.

Jim Ryan, the CEO of Sony Interactive Entertainment, stated that Sony had researched the feasibility of a "low priced, reduced spec" version of the PlayStation 5, like what Microsoft had done with its Xbox Series X and its lower-power counterpart the Xbox Series S; and concluded that they believed such consoles do not fare well, becoming obsolete too fast.

Marketing and release
Cerny first publicly described the new console in an interview with Wired magazine in April 2019. In early 2019, Sony's financial report for the quarter ending March 31, 2019, affirmed that new next-generation hardware was in development but would ship no earlier than April 2020. In a second Wired magazine interview in October 2019, Sony said it intended to ship its next-generation console worldwide by the end of 2020. The current hardware specifications were revealed in October 2019. At CES 2020, Sony unveiled the official logo for the platform, which follows the similar minimalist styling of the previous PlayStation consoles and brand. Full specifications were given in an online presentation by Cerny and published by Sony and Digital Foundry on March 18, 2020. Digital Foundry spoke with Cerny in detail and published a "deep dive" on April 2.

A major game library showcase had been planned for June 4, 2020, but was postponed until June 11 due to the George Floyd protests. This presentation was also the premiere of the console's external hardware design.

Sony planned to launch the PlayStation 5 by the 2020 end-of-year holiday period. The date and pricing was confirmed as part of a game showcase presentation on September 16, 2020; the release date in Australia, Japan, New Zealand, North America, and South Korea was confirmed for November 12, 2020, and for most of the rest of the world on November 19, 2020.

PlayStation 5's release in India was delayed, leading to speculation that a trademark dispute was the reason; the name "PS5" was briefly trademarked by a different person; eventually the dispute was resolved and the system released there on February 2, 2021. The console launched in Indonesia on January 22, 2021. The system launched in China on May 15, 2021.

The console launched with two models: a base version with an Ultra HD Blu-ray compatible optical disc drive for retail game support alongside online distribution via the PlayStation Store, and a lower-cost variant lacking the disc drive and retaining digital download support.

Following the September 16, 2020, presentation, Sony stated that pre-orders for the console were to open at various retailers on the following day. However, several retailers in the United States and the United Kingdom launched pre-orders that evening, causing a rush on pre-orders, including scalping as many stores' inventories were quickly sold out, and creating confusion. Sony apologized for the incident on September 19, 2020, and promised to increase more pre-order deliveries over the coming days and stock through the end of the year.

Worldwide supply of the console has remained low due to a global chip shortage since 2020. Sony expects a short retail stock until 2023. In August 2022, Sony announced a price increase by up to 20% in most of its markets except the US, citing global economic, inflationary, and supply chain pressures.

Hardware
The PlayStation 5 is powered by a custom system on a chip (SoC) designed in tandem by AMD and Sony, integrating a custom  AMD  CPU with eight cores running at a variable frequency capped at 3.5 GHz. The integrated GPU is also a custom unit based on AMD's RDNA 2 graphics architecture. The GPU has 36 compute units running at a variable frequency capped at 2.23 GHz, making it capable of a peak theoretical performance of 10 teraFLOPS. The GPU supports hardware-accelerated real-time ray tracing, a rendering technique that allows for realistic lighting and reflections. The console has 16 GB of GDDR6 SDRAM with a peak bandwidth of 448 GB/s, and integrates Bluetooth 5.1, and 802.11ax (Wi-Fi 6).

Both the CPU and GPU are monitored by a special boost system incorporating AMD's SmartShift technology that adjusts the frequency of these units based on the current activities of both to target ideal constant power drawn and a model SoC performance profile. For example, if the CPU is running at lower activity, the boost system may reduce its frequency and increase the frequency of the GPU for higher performance without otherwise affecting power use or cooling.

The cooling system includes a double-sided cooling fan for air intake that is 120 mm in diameter and 45 mm thick, and a large heat sink with a standard heat pipe design that Sony says has a "shape and airflow [which] make it possible to achieve the same performance as a vapor chamber". SoC cooling includes a liquid metal thermal conductor which sits between the SoC and the heat sink. The system contains a 350-watt power supply. Sony developed the PlayStation 5 to consume less energy than the PlayStation 4 for suspended gameplay states.

The console has a new audio technology called Tempest Engine, allowing hundreds of simultaneous sound sources compared to 50 for the PlayStation 4.

Storage architecture
The internal storage of the PlayStation 5 is a custom-built 825 GB solid-state drive (667 GB available) with a 12-channel interface, achieving a raw throughput of 5.5 GB/s. This atypical drive size was found to be optimal for the 12-channel pathway rather than a more common 512 GB or 1 TB unit. With a dedicated decompression unit supporting zlib and the new Oodle Kraken data compression protocol from RAD Game Tools, the unit has a typical throughput of 8–9 GB/s. Mark Cerny stated that a fast SSD was the top request from game developers so the goal not only was to have a theoretical raw read speed 100 times faster than PS4, but to eliminate input/output (I/O) bottleneck points so the performance target could be made effective. To this end, Sony designed a custom chip with multiple coprocessors to work in unison with the flash memory controller to reduce latency and channel data more efficiently around the system. At peak, the custom unit is capable of processing up to 22 GB/s of compressible data.

Storage for games is expandable through an NVM Express (NVMe) M.2 port for solid-state storage and USB hard drives, however at launch, NVMe drives were not supported and the console will not boot if one is installed. Beta system software support for the M.2 port was released in July 2021, while full support was added in a September 2021 system update. The internal SSD is not user-serviceable, since its flash memory chips and controller are built into the PlayStation 5's motherboard. Though game installation is mandatory, the user has some control of what to install such as only installing the multiplayer component of a game. While PlayStation 4 games can be moved between the internal SSD drive and an external drive to free up space on the SSD, PlayStation 5 games must be stored on the internal SSD to be played, and at launch could not be moved to an external storage device. An April 2021 system patch enabled users to move PlayStation 5 games to and from an external USB storage device, though the games must still reside on the internal SSD to be played.

The base version of the PlayStation 5 includes an Ultra HD Blu-ray optical drive compatible with Ultra HD Blu-ray discs, standard Blu-ray discs and DVDs. The PlayStation 5 does not support CDs and will not play 3D Blu-ray content. The choice of Ultra-HD Blu-ray as the disc medium means PlayStation 5 game discs can hold up to 100 GB of data, in contrast to PlayStation 4 games which usually came on dual-layer standard Blu-ray discs capable of holding up to 50 GB. An example of this is the title Gran Turismo 7. The PS4 version comes on 2 discs whereas the PS5 version comes on one.

Form factor 
The console's form factor was revealed during the June 11, 2020 presentation. Sony President Jim Ryan stated that the aesthetics are intended to be "transformational in how they look, sound, and feel". The launch unit is a two-tone design matching the design of the DualSense controller, with a black internal block flanked by two white wings along its sides, each lit by blue LEDs. Ryan stated that more colors than white and black may be available after launch. The unit can operate vertically or horizontally. Two long air intake vents run along the front, and heat exhaust vents dominate the rear. The wings are removable to access certain internal components such as the  NVMe SSD storage expansion slot, the power supply, and the optional Blu-ray disc drive. Beneath the side panels are two "dust catchers" holes allowing the user to vacuum out dust collected by the cooling system. Senior Art Director Yujin Morisawa led the console's case design, inspired by the term "five dimensions" and crafting the skeleton of its design around circles and squares that would make players comfortable when looking at it. Morisawa also had to manage the case shape to provide enough internal volume within the unit for all the technical hardware while reducing its size without restricting airflow.

The console has been recognized for its large size in comparison to previous gaming consoles, and its size has been attributed to ensuring effective cooling management and minimizing noise during operation.

The front includes a USB-C port with USB 3.1 Gen 2 and a USB-A port with USB 2.0. The back has two USB-A ports with USB 3.1 Gen 2, an HDMI 2.1 port, Gigabit Ethernet, and power.

DualSense and DualSense Edge controllers

The DualSense wireless controller for the PlayStation 5 was revealed on April 7, 2020. It is based on the prior DualShock controller but with modifications influenced by discussions with game designers and players. The DualSense controller has adaptive triggers with force feedback through voice coil actuators that can change the resistance to the player as necessary, supporting experiences such as virtually drawing an arrow from a bow. The DualSense maintains the same buttons as the DualShock 4, though the "Share" button was renamed to "Create" with additional means for players to create and share content. A new built-in microphone array was added so players can speak to others using only the controller, and the included controller speaker has been improved. It has two-tone coloring, primarily white with black facing, with the black piece being easily detachable. The light bar has been moved to the sides of the touchpad. It has USB-C connectivity, a higher-rated battery, and an audio jack. As an Easter egg, the texture of the controller unit is covered in miniature versions of the four PlayStation button symbols (cross, circle, square, and triangle).

Sony revealed the DualSense Edge (CFI-ZCP1), a new controller for the PlayStation 5 featuring additional capabilities, in August 2022. The controller will feature a more modular design than the DualSense with replaceable stick modules, multiple control profiles and an option of relocating map inputs. The controller was initially released on January 26, 2023 on PlayStation Direct, but was made available through other retailers on February 23, 2023.

Additional accessories
Accessories include a charging station for the DualSense, a new HD camera, and a media remote control. The Pulse 3D wireless headset is integrated with the PS5's Tempest Engine 3D audio technology.

The PS5 is backwards compatible with most existing PS4 controllers and accessories for PS4 games only some with limited functionality. Rock Band peripherals are supported since Rock Band 2. PS5 games can use the existing PlayStation Move, PlayStation Camera, PlayStation VR Aim Controller, officially licensed headsets, and specialty controllers with official licenses like flight sticks and racing wheels. Sony announced the PlayStation VR2 for the PlayStation 5 in January 2022.

Hardware revisions
Sony began shipping a minor hardware revision of the PlayStation 5 in August 2021. This design requires no screwdriver for the console stand.

In August 2022, Sony began shipping another hardware revision for both the base and digital versions of the PS5, further reducing the weight. The Digital Edition now weighs 3.4 kg (compared to 3.9 kg for the launch version) and the base version weighs 3.9 kg (compared to 4.5 kg for the launch version).

Future modifications could possibly include a detachable Blu-ray drive.

System software 

The PlayStation 5's redesigned user interface is characterized by Sony as "accessible and informative", providing real-time updates of friends' activities, available multiplayer activities, and single-player missions and rewards. Cerny stated "we don't want the player to have to boot the game, see what's up, boot the game, see what's up", so all of these options are "visible in the UI". Matt MacLaurin, the current vice president of UX design at PlayStation, described the redesigned user interface as a "very interesting evolution of the OS", and a "100 percent overhaul of the PS4 UI and some very different new concepts". MacLaurin stated that the UI is extremely fast with a new and robust visual language.

Eurogamer said the user interface was conceived for responsiveness, improved accessibility, clarity, and simplicity. It is rendered in 4K resolution and high dynamic range. Users are greeted with a stylistic boot-up animation and a new login screen. The central design concepts and motifs introduced on the PS4 were redesigned into a new home screen user interface. The top of the screen has a row of applications, and two upper tabs to switch between showing games or media apps. Selecting a game directly reveals individual activities such as a specific level or multiplayer mode. PlayStation Store is no longer a standalone application and is now fully integrated into the home screen user interface.

The most significant departure from the PS4 interface is the introduction of the Control Center, instantly summoned from the bottom of the screen by pressing the PS button. The Control Center is divided into two sections. The upper portion is a row of cards suggesting actions based on the current game or recent actions such as a group chat. Game-related cards may present players with gameplay information such as a progress report toward completing specific missions, or listing game challenges with an option to jump directly to them. PlayStation Plus subscribers see game activity cards with hints, tips, screenshots, or videos detailing how to complete the activity. System-level items may present the player with options such as PlayStation Store sale information, or recent screenshots taken by the user to be shared. These features are available for PS5 games or for updated PS4 games. The lower portion of the Control Center contains a customizable horizontal row of icons, including notifications, status updates, friends list, and system settings. According to internal materials reviewed by Vice, the strategy behind this "activities"-focused UI was to help players in committing time towards games particularly single-player video games which Sony felt were thriving on the PlayStation console environment. Sony recognized that at present, many players did not have as much time to commit to playing games, so the notion of activity cards was used to help give players an idea of what activities they could do in a game and how long it would take so that they could work that activity into their schedule.

The PlayStation 5 supports 7plus, 9Now, ABC iview, AbemaTV, All 4, Amazon Freevee, Amazon Prime Video, Anghami, Apple Music, the Apple TV app, BBC iPlayer, Blim TV, Crackle, Crave, Crunchyroll, Curiosity Stream, DAZN, Disney+, Emby, Foxtel Now, HBO Max, Hulu, iHeartRadio, ITVX, Joyn, Kayo Sports, Mubi, My5, MyCanal, Neon, Netflix, the NFL TV app, Niconico, NOW, Pandora, Paramount+, Peacock, Plex, Pluto TV, Popcornflix, Red Bull TV, Salto, Showmax, Sky Go, Spotify, Stan, Star+, Tubi, TuneIn, TVNZ+, Twitch, Viaplay, Videoland, Vudu, YouTube TV, YouTube, and YuppTV, while support for other streaming services has been pledged for the future. The system includes support for PlayStation Now, Sony's subscription-based cloud gaming service to play games from older generations of PlayStation consoles. Sony's Remote Play application, available on the PlayStation 4, Microsoft Windows, iOS and Android devices, was updated just prior to the PlayStation 5's launch to allow a user to remotely play their PlayStation 5 games on these other devices over a local network.

Software updates 

In April 2021, Sony released a new software update through which users can transfer their downloaded PS5 game to an external USB hard drive to free up space. Sony announced a PlayStation 5 system software beta program in June 2021, similar to the Xbox Insider program, where signed-up users can receive early releases of planned updates to the console's software for testing prior to their release. One of the first major features offered in this program was support for expanding internal storage via the M.2 port, added in the beta software path in July 2021.

In September 2021, Sony released a new software update offering support for a new trophy tracker, Control Center customization, 3D audio support for built-in TV speakers, internal SSD expansion and several UX enhancements. Sony introduced Game Trials in October 2021, starting with a limited release for UK users for Death Stranding: Director's Cut and Sackboy: A Big Adventure. Users have access to download and play the full version of the game for a fixed amount of time through these Game Trials, after which they would be required to buy the game to continue playing.

In March 2022, Sony released software update 5.00 which adds several improvements for accessibility such as an improved screen reader with support for features like mono audio, reading notifications aloud, additional language support, and the ability to show a check mark on enabled settings. Support for voice commands was also introduced in this update for users in the United States and United Kingdom, which allows users to control their PlayStation 5 by saying "Hey, PlayStation" and then a chosen command. Support for the Ukrainian language was also added, and Game Base was enhanced with the abilities to view all friends in a new "Friends" tab, more easily decline friend requests, and other enhancements and updates. There were also various enhancements made to trophies, child accounts, the home screen, and other features.

On 8 March 2023, Sony released software update 7.00.  The main features are: VRR support for 1440p resolution, added ability to transfer data between PS5 consoles, support for voice chat on Discord, and support for using voice to save video clips of gameplay (at release, this is only available in English for the USA and UK).

Games

Each PlayStation 5 console comes pre-installed with Astro's Playroom, a game designed to serve as a demonstration of the DualSense controller. Games are not region-locked, so games purchased in one region can be played on consoles in all regions.

Sony announced its concurrent responsibilities of supporting the PlayStation 4 community, and embracing the PlayStation 5 as a major technological advancement. In an interview with GamesIndustry.biz, Ryan stated "We have always said that we believe in generations. We believe that when you go to all the trouble of creating a next-gen console, that it should include features and benefits that the previous generation does not include. And that, in our view, people should make games that can make the most of those features." Discussing the capabilities of the DualSense controller with Geoff Keighley, General manager Eric Lempel affirmed that Sony "want[s] to evolve every part of the experience", but for that to happen "we can't take everybody with us from previous consoles into [a next-generation experience]. You need new hardware, you need new devices to experience what these developers want you to experience." Ratchet & Clank: Rift Apart was highlighted as a next-generation game that is not technically possible on older hardware. Lempel assured Keighley that interest in PlayStation 4 will not end abruptly, with more to come.

Sony's definition of consoles as distinct generations had been widely interpreted as an era-defining shift to PS5-exclusive games that exploit the console's capabilities instead of releasing cross-generation games that play across both PlayStation consoles. Ryan said that there should be no disappointment as the PS5 versions take advantage of the console's advanced feature set and initially planned that PS4 versions can be freely upgraded. Few major games such as Horizon Forbidden West are developed as concurrent releases for PS4 and PS5, and Sony supports any publisher that wants to offer enhanced versions of PS4 games at no additional cost.  However, in May 2021, Sony announced a major shift in this approach, with previously PS5-exclusive games Gran Turismo 7 and God of War Ragnarök now planned as both PS4 and PS5 games. Game journalists believed this was a factor related to impact of the global semiconductor shortage from the COVID-19 pandemic on PlayStation 5 availability. Sony initially had planned to charge PS4 users to upgrade to the PS5 version of Horizon Forbidden West when preorders were announced, but after negative feedback from consumers (who pointed out that Sony had previously mentioned that Horizon Forbidden West would have a free upgrade), stated that this upgrade will be free, but all future PS4 to PS5 upgrades from their first-party games will be at cost, reversing course from their earlier plans.

Eurogamer reported that Sony's certification program as of May 2020 required PS4 games, submitted for certification after July 13, 2020, to be natively compatible with the PlayStation 5.

Backward compatibility

According to Hideaki Nishino, Sony's senior vice president of Platform Planning and Management, the PS5 is designed to be backward compatible with more than "99 percent" of PS4's 4,000+ game library, playable from launch day. The console is compatible with PlayStation VR. Because of PS5's high-speed SSD and increased processing power, many PS4 games gain from improved loading times or gameplay speeds "so that they can benefit from higher or more stable frame rates and potentially higher resolutions". Players can synchronize their saved game files through cloud storage or transfer them using a USB storage device so no progress is lost. Backward compatibility is enabled in part by the similarity of hardware architecture, such as "extra logic" in the RDNA 2 GPU that ensures compatibility with PS4's GCN-based GPU. Mark Cerny explained during a March 2020 presentation and later in an interview with Digital Foundry how CPU clock timing required particular attention; though the Zen 2 CPU has an instruction set to handle the PS4's Jaguar CPU, their timings can be very different, so Sony worked closely with AMD when developing the Zen 2 CPU to more closely match the Jaguar's timings. PS5 backward compatibility may exhibit errors with some PS4 games, and does not include previous generations. However, some older PlayStation console games are available through the PlayStation Plus game streaming service which is available for the PlayStation 5. The PlayStation 4's Share menu cannot be displayed but the PS5's Create menu can be used to capture screenshots or video.

All compatible downloaded versions of PS4 games are visible in the library on the PS5 and available for download. The games can also be copied via USB hard drive or Wi-Fi. Save data can be copied in the same way or via the cloud storage. On October 9, 2020, Sony released a list of ten PS4 games identified as being incompatible with PS5; the list has shortened since as some developers released compatibility updates for previously incompatible games. As of December 16, 2021, the official PlayStation website shows six PS4 games that remain incompatible with PS5; Afro Samurai 2: Revenge of Kuma Volume One, Hitman Go: Definitive Edition, Just Deal With It!, Robinson: The Journey, Shadwen, and We Sing.

Reception
The PlayStation 5 was generally well received at launch, with much praise of its DualSense controller's improved haptic feedback and adaptive triggers. Astro's Playroom, which comes pre-installed on every PS5 and is designed to demonstrate the controller's features, was praised with Laptop Mag calling it "deceptively cute". The exclusive line-up, including Spider-Man: Miles Morales and Demon's Souls, was heavily praised, although some reviewers, such as TechRadar, said there should have been more launch games. The console's user interface was generally praised for being fast and easy to navigate.

Many reviewers found the console's design polarizing. CNET described the black and white scheme as "clearly meant to be a sculptural conversation piece". The large size was criticized by Tom's Guide as "inelegant", and by others as frustrating its integration into a home entertainment center. Many also acknowledged the size for improving the cooling and quieting of its operation. The relatively small 667 GB of usable SSD space was criticized.

More technical reviews, such as those by Digital Foundry, noted that features such as variable refresh rate and the advertised 8K video output mode were not present at launch. They lauded the ray-tracing, SSD speed, and 120 Hz output capabilities. Yahtzee Croshaw criticized the usage of controller-mounted speakers as damaging for immersion in a discussion of the Callisto Protocol due to the disconnect between radio chatter being relayed through the controller while all other sounds were being played as normal.

Sales
The PlayStation 5, as with the Xbox Series X/S, was in limited supply immediately upon launch, and through 2021 due to a global semiconductor shortage, combined with increased demand for video game consoles due to the COVID-19 pandemic. Sony expects supply to continue to be limited until at least 2022. Scalpers took advantage of the shortage, attempting to sell the console for thousands of dollars. Sony expanded its PlayStation Direct program to sell consoles directly to consumers within Europe in November 2021 as to bypass scalpers.

Two weeks after launch, Sony declared the largest launch in PlayStation history, surpassing PS4's 2.1 million units in its first two weeks in 2013. During the system's first week of release in Japan, 103,901 standard consoles were sold, and 14,181 Digital Editions were sold, for a combined total of 118,082, making it the best-selling console in the country for that week. By September 2021, Sony reported over one million PS5 sales in Japan. In comparison, its predecessor did not reach one million consoles sold until a full year after release. In the UK, the PlayStation 5 was the best-selling video game console sold in the month of November. In Spain, the PS5 sold over 43,000 units in the first week of release.

Sony reported total shipments of the PS5 through its fiscal quarter ending December 31, 2020 of 4.5 million units, which were similar numbers to the PS4's launch shipments. Total shipments of PlayStation 5 reached 7.8 million by March 31, 2021, surpassing the 7.6 million units that the PlayStation 4 had shipped in its first two-quarters of release. Sony reported that as of July 18, 2021, 10 million PS5 units had been sold through, making the PlayStation 5 their fastest-selling console unit to date. The company later confirmed that by June 30, 2021, it had shipped 10.1 million consoles, indicating that nearly every shipped console had been sold as soon as it reached the market. Console shipments surpassed 13.4 million as of September 30, 2021. The company anticipated in August it has enough stock hardware to ship more than 22 million PS5 units by the end of its 2021 fiscal year in March 2022, but this was revised to 15 million units in November. Despite this, sales during the fiscal year 2022 were forecast to increase to 22.6 million units. Bloomberg News reported in January 2022 that Sony was continuing to produce the PlayStation 4 rather than discontinue it at the end of 2021 as to help alleviate the shortage of PlayStation 5 while the chip shortage continued. Sales of the PlayStation 5 reached 20 million units by May 31, 2022.

References

External links

 

 
2020 in video gaming
2020s toys
Backward-compatible video game consoles
Computer-related introductions in 2020
Golden Joystick Award winners
Home video game consoles
Ninth-generation video game consoles
PlayStation (brand)
Products introduced in 2020
Regionless game consoles
Sony consoles
X86-based game consoles